The following lists events that happened in 1949 in El Salvador.

Incumbents
President: Revolutionary Council of Government 
Vice President: Vacant

Events

September

 11 September – Municipal Limeño, a Salvadoran football club, was established.

References

 
El Salvador
1940s in El Salvador
Years of the 20th century in El Salvador
El Salvador